Benjamin Fillon (15 March 1819 – 23 May 1881) was a French numismatist and archaeologist. Much of his lifetime's work was devoted to researching the French mathematician, Franciscus Vieta, a key figure in developing new algebra.

Main works 
 Considérations historiques et artistiques sur les monnaies de France
 Poitou et Vendée
 Considérations historiques et artistiques sur les monnaies de France
 Études Numismatiques

References

External links

People from Vendée
1819 births
1881 deaths
French archaeologists
French epigraphers
French numismatists